Stilpnus may refer to:

 Stilpnus (wasp), a genus of wasps in the family Ichneumonidae
 Stilpnus, a genus of beetles in the family Elateridae; synonym of Ignelater